The city of Chester in Cheshire, England, contains over 650 structures that are designated as listed buildings by English Heritage and included in the National Heritage List for England. Of these, over 500 are listed at Grade II, the lowest of the three gradings given to listed buildings and applied to "buildings of national importance and special interest". This list contains the Grade II listed buildings in the unparished area of the city to the south of the River Dee. Immediately to the south of the river is the area of Handbridge.

The listed structures in this area have resulted from the growth of the city from the beginning of the 19th century. Many of the listed buildings are houses, and there are also shops, a public house, churches and associated structures, a former boys' club, mileposts, and a telephone kiosk. Overleigh Cemetery was laid out in 1848–50, and contains listed structures, including tombs, monuments, gates, a bridge, and a cenotaph.

See also

Grade I listed buildings in Cheshire West and Chester
Grade II* listed buildings in Cheshire West and Chester
Grade II listed buildings in Chester (central)
Grade II listed buildings in Chester (east)
Grade II listed buildings in Chester (north and west)

References
Citations

Sources

 

 South
Chester (south)